Bonapartism is the political ideology supervening from Napoleon Bonaparte and his followers and successors. The term was used to refer to people who hoped to restore the House of Bonaparte and its style of government. In this sense, a Bonapartiste was a person who either actively participated in or advocated for conservative, monarchist and imperial political factions in 19th-century France. 

Bonapartism emerged in 1814 with the first fall of Napoleon. However, it only developed doctrinal clarity and cohesion by the 1840s.

After Napoleon, the term was applied to the French politicians who seized power in the Coup of 18 Brumaire, ruling in the French Consulate and subsequently in the First and Second French Empires. The Bonapartistes desired an empire under the House of Bonaparte, the Corsican family of Napoleon Bonaparte (Napoleon I of France) and his nephew Louis Napoleon (Napoleon III of France).

In recent years, the term has been used more generally for political movements that advocate for an authoritarian centralised state, with a strongman charismatic leader, support for the military, and conservatism.

Beliefs 

Marxism and Leninism developed a vocabulary of political terms that included Bonapartism, derived from their analysis of the career of Napoleon Bonaparte. Karl Marx, a student of Jacobinism and the French Revolution, was a contemporary critic of the Second Republic and the Second Empire. He used "Bonapartism" to refer to a situation in which counter-revolutionary military officers seize power from revolutionaries, and use selective reforms to co-opt the radicalism of the popular classes. Marx argued that in the process, Bonapartists preserve and mask the power of a narrower ruling class.

Noted political scientists and historians greatly differ on the definition and interpretation of Bonapartism. Sudhir Hazareesingh's book The Legend of Napoleon explores numerous interpretations of the term. He says that it refers to a 
"popular national leader confirmed by popular election, above party politics, promoting equality, progress, and social change, with a belief in religion as an adjunct to the State, a belief that the central authority can transform society and a belief in the 'nation' and its glory and a fundamental belief in national unity." Hazareesingh believes that although recent research shows Napoleon used forced conscription of French troops, some men must have fought believing in Napoleon's ideals. He says that to argue Bonapartism co-opted the masses is an example of the Marxist perspective of false consciousness: the idea that the masses can be manipulated by a few determined leaders in the pursuit of ends.

Bonapartist claimants

After becoming emperor in 1804, Napoleon I established a Law of Succession, providing that the Bonapartist claim to the throne should pass firstly to Napoleon's own legitimate male descendants through the male line. At that time he had no legitimate sons, and it seemed unlikely he would have any due to the age of his wife Joséphine. He eventually achieved an annulment, without Papal approval, of his marriage to Josephine. He married the younger Marie Louise, with whom he had one son.

The law of succession provided that if Napoleon's own direct line died out, the claim passed first to his older brother Joseph and his legitimate male descendants through the male line, then to his younger brother Louis and his legitimate male descendants through the male line. His other brothers, Lucien and Jérôme, and their descendants, were omitted from the succession (even though Lucien was older than Louis) because they had either politically opposed the Emperor or made marriages of which he disapproved. Napoleon abdicated in favor of his son after his defeat in 1815. Although the Bonapartes were deposed and the old Bourbon monarchy restored, Bonapartists recognized Napoleon's son as Napoleon II. A sickly child, he was virtually imprisoned in Austria, and died young and unmarried, without any descendants. When the French Empire was restored to power in 1852, the emperor was Napoleon III, Louis Bonaparte's only living legitimate son (their brother Joseph having died in 1844 without having had a legitimate son, only daughters).

In 1852, Napoleon III enacted a new decree on the succession. The claim was given to his own male legitimate descendants in the male line (though at that time he had no son, Louis later had a legitimate son, Eugène, who was recognized by Bonapartists as "Napoleon IV" before dying young and unmarried). If Napoleon III's line died out, he decreed that the claim should pass to Jérôme, Napoleon's youngest brother (who had previously been excluded), and his male descendants by Princess Catharina of Württemberg in the male line. (Excluded were his descendants by his first marriage, to the American commoner Elizabeth Patterson, of which Napoleon I had greatly disapproved.) The Bonapartist claimants since 1879, have been the descendants of Jérôme and Catherine of Württemberg in the male line.

The Bonapartist laws of succession were far from traditional. The family members ignored primogeniture (by excluding Lucien Bonaparte and his descendants); they annulled marriages to achieve their goals; and they did not submit to the Pope's rights as final arbiter on the validity of marriages. The very claim of the Bonaparte family to rule France was far from traditional.

List of Bonapartist claimants to the French throne since 1814 
Those who ruled are indicated with an asterisk.

Marxism

Based on the career of Louis-Napoléon Bonaparte, Marxism and Leninism defined Bonapartism as a political expression. Karl Marx was a student of Jacobinism and the French Revolution, as well as a contemporary critic of the Second Republic and Second Empire. He used the term Bonapartism to refer to a situation in which counterrevolutionary military officers seize power from revolutionaries, and use selective reformism to co-opt the radicalism of the masses. In the process, Marx argued, Bonapartists preserve and mask the power of a narrower ruling class. He believed that both Napoleon I and Napoleon III had corrupted revolutions in France in this way. Marx offered this definition of and analysis of Bonapartism in The Eighteenth Brumaire of Louis Bonaparte, written in 1852. In this document, he drew attention to what he calls the phenomenon's repetitive history with one of his most quoted lines, typically condensed aphoristically as: "History repeats itself, first as tragedy, second as farce."

Marx believed that a Bonapartist regime could exert great power, because there was no class with enough confidence or power to firmly establish its authority in its own name. A leader who appeared to stand above the class struggle could take the mantle of power. He believed that this was an inherently unstable situation, as the apparently all-powerful leader would be swept aside when the class struggle in society was resolved.

Other Bonapartists 
In 1976, when Jean-Bédel Bokassa, a great admirer of Napoleon, made himself Emperor Bokassa I of Central Africa, he declared that the ideology of his regime was Bonapartism and added golden bees to his imperial standard.

See also

List of political systems in France
Poujadisme
Caesarism

References

Bibliography

Further reading
 Alexander, Robert S. Bonapartism and revolutionary Tradition in France: the Fédérés of 1815 (Cambridge University Press, 2002)
 Baehr, Peter R., and Melvin Richter, eds. Dictatorship in history and theory: Bonapartism, Caesarism, and totalitarianism (Cambridge University Press, 2004)
 Dulffer, Jost. "Bonapartism, Fascism and National Socialism." Journal of Contemporary History (1976): 109–128. In JSTOR
 
 Mitchell, Allan. "Bonapartism as a model for Bismarckian politics." Journal of Modern History (1977): 181–199. In JSTOR
 Bluche, Frédéric, Le Bonapartisme, collection Que sais-je ?, Paris, Presses universitaires de France, 1981.
 Choisel, Francis, Bonapartisme et gaullisme, Paris, Albatros, 1987.

External links
Mouvement Bonapartiste

 
Authoritarianism
Eponymous political ideologies
Conservatism in France
Militarism
Monarchism in France
Populism
Revolution terminology
Right-wing ideologies
Right-wing populism in France
Rival successions
Social theories